Manu antiquus is a species of extinct bird of uncertain affinities from the Oligocene of New Zealand. It was described by Brian Marples in 1946 from fossil material (part of a furcula) found near Duntroon, north Otago, in the South Island. Marples suggested that it might be an early albatross; subsequent researchers have speculated that it could be a pelagornithid; however, its affinities remain uncertain. The genus name Manu is Māori for “bird”; the specific epithet antiquus is Latin for “old” or “ancient”.

References

Fossil taxa described in 1946
Oligocene birds
Extinct birds of New Zealand
Extinct monotypic bird genera
Bird enigmatic taxa
Prehistoric bird genera
Taxa named by Brian John Marples